Basia Lyjak is a first generation Polish-Canadian rock singer-songwriter from Toronto, Ontario.

Biography 
Born and raised in Toronto, Ontario, Canada, Basia has said she was singing before she could speak. Music was always a passion for her throughout her childhood and teens, and she was always active in the art in whatever capacity she could be, in and out of school.

After graduating from secondary school, Basia auditioned for an all-girl group called "Aphrodisia," put together by Sky (Canadian band) founders, James Renald and Antoine Sicotte. She and three other girls were picked out of thousands of applicants, and went on to be briefly managed by the duo in Montreal, until management changed hands. The group were then flown to New York to record a 5-song demo, produced by The Berman Bros. of EuroSyndicate Productions.  and it was around this time that Basia branched out on her own and began to pursue a career as a solo artist.

"Basia Lyjak"
After leaving Aphrodisia, Basia began to apply what she had learned from the experience to her songwriting and began collaboration and pre-production on her self-titled first album. The 6-song EP was released in 2002.

Despite being proud of the milestone of her first album, Basia still wasn't certain that the songs represented where she wanted to be as an artist and songwriter. At this time she took a break from her solo project and joined a cover band called Wednesday Adams, where she continued to hone her voice by performing songs by artists like No Doubt, Veruca Salt (band), Tracy Bonham, Pat Benatar and Guns N' Roses, to name a few.

Writings on the Wall
In 2005, Basia began jamming and collaborating with just about anyone who was up for it, and the seeds for Writings on the Wall were planted. Pre-production began at Studio8 in Toronto, with longtime friend Jeff Iantorno, and eventually moved to DC Music, where the songs were recorded and produced by Bombay Doors bassist Andrew Lauzon.

The EP was released on February 2, 2007, at Toronto's ElMocambo Tavern, at Basia's first headlining show since her Wednesday Adams days.

Don't Talk single
Basia released the single Don't Talk in 2008 as a follow-up to Writings on the Wall. The song, co-written with Kyle Riabko (currently starring in Spring Awakening), was recorded with producer Brian Moncarz, who has worked with artists like The Junction, Pilot Speed, .moneen. and more, and currently co-owns Rattlebox Studios with producer David Bottrill, whose credits include Tool, Silverchair and Mudvayne. A video was released for the song on March 14, 2009 during Basia's Canadian Music Week showcase. It was directed by Ryan M. Andrews of Blackguardism Creations, filmed by cinematographer Carl Elster of Forever Epic Films, visually designed by Stacey Laureyessens of theOriginalFace.ca and costumed by Mila Starr at Metal Star Fashion.

2009
Basia announced in April 2009 that she was awarded a FACTOR demo grant, resulting in the June 2009 single "What It Feels Like," again co-written with her Don't Talk collaborator Kyle Riabko. In November 2009, she released another single, "Never Wanted Anything," co-written with Norm Sabourin of Aqua Sound Studios. The track features a guitar solo by Sabourin, who also served as producer, and backing vocals by Toronto R&B/soul star Kim Davis.

In addition to these releases and gigging in Ontario, 2009 also saw Basi"a branch out into scoring for TV and video games. She, Ron and Dave can be heard on the theme song for the Down Under travel show, Jill & Stacey Do The Roo," as well as the trailer for "The Game Cartel" video game.

In December 2009, CanClone.ca released a rock mix of their Christmas song (originally recorded, but not released, in 2008), with Basia singing the track.

2010
While Basia released solo material at the tail end of 2009, she did not release any solo material in 2010. Instead, she lent her voice to a few other artists' projects. Basia can be heard on "Waiting," a song for the troops written by Peter Haley. Two mixes of the song were released, with proceeds dedicated to the Wounded Warriors Fund. The track showcases a mournful, country side of Basia's range and timbre not widely heard in her own solo material. Following "Waiting," Basia teamed up with R&B artist Spoila Ranks for his track "Where Is The Love," which also featured a slew of fellow Toronto talent.

According to her website, Basia also spent several months away from her home in Toronto - she lived briefly in Calgary, Alberta to check out the west coast music scene, with support from Calgary Motor Coach, who supply tour buses to many major acts passing through Canada.

In the fall of 2010, Basia received her second FACTOR grant.

2011
Over the course of the end of 2010 and until the early spring of 2011, Basia was recording with producer Steve Major at Wellesley Sound Studios, recording three tracks ("Sunshine," "Hero" and "Yeah Yeah Yeah") made possible because of FACTOR's contribution. Basia also completed a fourth track called "Sick N' Tired" with former Nelly Furtado and Klooch member, Yurko Mychaluk. "Sunshine" was released in May 2011 and "Sick N' Tired" in August 2011. A video for "Hero" was shot with Karma Pictures and director of photography John Holosko in May 2011 for a winter 2011 release.

Basia, as a solo artist, is backed by a series of leading Canadian musicians, including Ron Bechard (of Sin Dealer, Crash Karma, formerly of Edwin (musician) and Edwin & the Pressure, briefly of Three Days Grace) on guitars, Dave Carreiro (of Nigel's 11 with Chris Kirkpatrick) on bass, Dale Harrison (Headstones (band), Alannah Myles) on drums and multi-instrumentalist Pat Kelly on backing vocals and keyboards. Other present and past musicians who play for Lyjak include bassists and guitarists Darryl "Daz" Coppins, Andrew Lauzon, James Naro and Deacon Day and drummers Glenn Nash, Jeff Zurba, Chris Lesso.

Discography

2011:
- Sick N' Tired (August 30, 2011)
- Sunshine (May 10, 2011)

2010:
- Where Is The Love? - by Spoila Ranks, featuring various artists, including Basia Lyjak
- Waiting - a song for the troops (performed by Basia Lyjak, written by Peter Haley)
- Santa's Been (Never Again) - rock mix (CanClone.ca's Christmas song performed, though not written, by Basia)

2009:
- Santa's Been - Never Again (CanClone.ca's Christmas song performed, though not written, by Basia)
- Never Wanted Anything single (November 11, 2009)
- What It Feels Like single (June 19, 2009)

2008:
- Don't Talk Single (March 20, 2008)

2007:
- Writings on the Wall (February 2, 2007)
1. Stuttering
2. Bye Bye
3. Plastic
4. Torn
5. Lies
- Metal Queen Management Compilation Vol. 3

2002:
- Basia Lyjak EP
1 Waiting For You
2 Invincible
3 Stuck
4 Sometimes
5 Open Space
6 I'll Call You

Interviews
 Basia Lyjak writings on the Wall-Toronto Music Scene

References
Basia's YouTube Channel
Basia Lyjak's official MySpace.
Basia's SonicBids EPK
IOM Magazine interview
Metro News interview

Canadian women singer-songwriters
Canadian singer-songwriters
Canadian people of Polish descent
Living people
Musicians from Toronto
Year of birth missing (living people)